Itay Segev (born June 15, 1995) is an Israeli professional basketball player for Hapoel Jerusalem of the Israeli Basketball Premier League. He was named the Israeli League Most Improved Player in 2016.

Early years
Segev was born in Kfar Tavor, Israel. He played for Hapoel Emek Yizra'el youth team and the Wingate Academy in his late teens.

Professional career
On August 8, 2012, Segev started his professional career with Maccabi Tel Aviv, signing a five-year deal.

On August 26, 2013, Segev was loaned to Hapoel Holon for the 2013–14 season. On February 25, 2014, Segev won the Slam Dunk Contest during the 2014 Israeli All-Star Event.

On July 24, 2014, Segev was loaned to Hapoel Gilboa Galil for the 2014–15 season.

On August 8, 2015, Maccabi Tel Aviv announced that Segev will be included in their roster of the 2015–16 season. On June 3, 2016, Segev was named Israeli League Most Improved Player.

On June 23, 2016, Segev signed a two-year contract extension with Maccabi Tel Aviv.

On September 9, 2017, Segev was named Maccabi's team captain. However, On January 22, 2018, Maccabi announced that he will no longer serve as the team captain after requesting to leave the team.

On June 26, 2018, Segev signed with Maccabi Rishon LeZion for the 2018–19 season. Segev helped Rishon LeZion win the 2018 Israeli League Cup, as well as reaching the 2019 Israeli League Final, where they eventually lost to his former team Maccabi Tel Aviv.

On July 15, 2019, Segev signed a one-year deal with Ironi Nahariya.

On June 8, 2020, he signed with BCM Gravelines-Dunkerque of the French LNB Pro A.

On July 11, 2021, he signed with Hapoel Jerusalem of the Israeli Basketball Premier League and Basketball Champions League.

Israeli national team
Segev was a member of the Israeli Under-16, Under-18  and Under-20 national teams. In 2016 He made his first appearance in the Israeli National team.

See also
Basketball in Israel

References

External links
 RealGM Profile
 EuroLeague Profile
 Eurobasket Profile

1995 births
Living people
Centers (basketball)
Hapoel Gilboa Galil Elyon players
Hapoel Holon players
Hapoel Jerusalem B.C. players
Ironi Nahariya players
Israeli men's basketball players
Israeli people of Iranian-Jewish descent
Maccabi Rishon LeZion basketball players
Maccabi Tel Aviv B.C. players
Power forwards (basketball)